Queen of Angels Church (formerly known as St. Peter's Church) was a historic Black Catholic church on Belmont Avenue (now Irvine Turner Blvd) at Morton Street in Newark, New Jersey. It was the first Catholic parish for African Americans in the Archdiocese of Newark.

History 
Queen of Angels was built between 1854 and 1861 and was Newark's first African-American Catholic parish, becoming such in 1926. Its original 1930 building was destroyed in 1958, and the parish relocated, taking over a space at a church once known as St. Peter's.

During the Civil Rights Movement, Martin Luther King Jr. held meetings at the church for the Poor People's Campaign and the church also helped organized a march for racial harmony after his assassination.

The church was added to the National Register of Historic Places in 1972, administered by the Society of African Missions beginning in 1979, and was later closed in 2012.

The church was slated for demolition in 2014 and demolished in 2016.

See also 
 National Register of Historic Places listings in Essex County, New Jersey

References

Roman Catholic churches in Newark, New Jersey
Churches on the National Register of Historic Places in New Jersey
Gothic Revival church buildings in New Jersey
Roman Catholic churches completed in 1854
19th-century Roman Catholic church buildings in the United States
National Register of Historic Places in Newark, New Jersey
New Jersey Register of Historic Places
African-American Roman Catholic churches

Society of African Missions